Shrinivasa Varakhedi is an Indian academic, who is serving as a Vice Chancellor of Central sanskrit university, New Delhi.
He was former VC of Kavikulaguru Kalidas Sanskrit University, Ramtek. Dist. Nagpur Maharashtra from 14 December 2017. He is simultaneously working as an Acting Vice Chancellor of Gondwana University, Gadchiroli from 7 September 2020 till date. Prof. Varakhedi was Honorary Dean at the Chinmaya Eswar Gurukula for Sanskrit and Indic Traditions. He was also Vice Chancellor (Acting) of Karnataka Sanskrit University, Bangalore from 26 May 2014 to 15 June 2015. He is a scholar of Nyaya & other ancient Indian shastras. He was one of the earliest traditional scholars who took up computer programming in the area of computational linguistics, and he has been awarded the Maharshi Badarayan Vyas Samman by the President of India, for contributions in interdisciplinary research.

Career
After taking a post-graduate Vidwaduttama degree in Navya Nyaya at the Poornaprajna Vidyapeetha in Bengaluru, which he passed with a 1st rank, he joined the Language Technology Research Center, Indian Institute of Information Technology, Hyderabad, in 1998 as a researcher.

He went on to become an Assistant Professor of Navya Nyaya at Poornaprajna Vidyapeetham, and later on to teach computational linguistics at the Rashtriya Samskrit Vidyapeetha in Tirupati. He worked as Director in Sanskrit Academy, Osmania University, Hyderabad from Feb 2007 to 2011. Later he served as Director of Karnataka State Sanskrit Education till 2013. He  was then appointed as Professor in the faculty of shashtras in Karnataka Sanskrit University. He served as Dean, Director of PG studies and Research, Registrar in charge in the same university.

He did his PhD Vidyavaridhi at the Rashtriya Sanskrit Sansthan in representing Navy Nyaya in modern technology schemes, under the guidance of Prof. Haridasa Bhat.

Research areas & publications
He has published in the areas of computational linguistics, Sanskrit literature, darshana shastra. Some of them are :

English

The Path of Proofs - Pramanapaddhati of Sri Jayatirtha, 2011.

Honours & Distinctions
 Created the structure to the newly set up Directorate for Sanskrit Education in Karnataka State during 2010 - 2011
 Member of the committee for the Vision & Roadmap for the development of Sanskrit, Ministry of HRD, Government of India.

References

Year of birth missing (living people)
Living people
Indian academic administrators
Indian Sanskrit scholars